Nature Chemistry is a monthly peer-reviewed scientific journal published by Nature Portfolio. It was established in April 2009. The editor-in-chief is Stuart Cantrill. The journal covers all aspects of chemistry. Publishing formats include primary research articles, reviews, news, views, highlights of notable research from other journals, commentaries, book reviews, correspondence. Other formats are analysis of issues such as education, funding, policy, intellectual property, and the impact chemistry has on society.

Abstracting and indexing
The journal is abstracted and indexed in:
 Chemical Abstracts Service
 Science Citation Index
 Current Contents/Physical, Chemical & Earth Sciences
 BIOSIS Previews
According to the Journal Citation Reports, the journal has a 2021 impact factor of 24.274.

References

External links 
 

Chemistry journals
Monthly journals
Nature Research academic journals
Publications established in 2009
English-language journals